Jerome Chodorov (August 10, 1911 – September 12, 2004) was an American playwright, librettist, and screenwriter. He co-wrote the book with Joseph A. Fields for the original Broadway musical Wonderful Town starring Rosalind Russell. The musical was based on short stories by Ruth McKenney.

Biography
Chodorov was born in New York City, and entered journalism in the 1930s.  He is best known for his 1940 play My Sister Eileen, its 1942 screen adaptation, and the musical Wonderful Town, which was based on his play. Joseph A. Fields was his frequent collaborator. The writing team also adapted Sally Benson's short stories as the play and film Junior Miss.  Chodorov was Hollywood blacklisted during the McCarthy era.

His brother, Edward Chodorov (1904–1988), was also a playwright, author of the perennial favorite of amateur groups, Kind Lady.

Works
Sources: Playbill; Doollee

PlaysSchoolhouse on the Lot (1938)My Sister Eileen (1940)Junior Miss (1941)Those Endearing Young Charms (1943)The French Touch (1945)Anniversary Waltz (1954)The Ponder Heart (1956)Three Bags Full (1966)A Talent for Murder (with Norman Panama) (Edgar Award, 1982, Best Play)

MusicalsWonderful Town (Tony Award for Best Musical, 1953)I Had a BallThe Girl in Pink TightsWork as theatre directorAlive and Kicking (revue, 1950) - additional materialThe Gazebo (1958) - director
Make A Million (1958) - directorChristine (1960) - directorBlood, Sweat and Stanley Poole (1961), director

FilmThe Case of the Lucky Legs (a 1935 Perry Mason film)Louisiana Purchase (1941)My Sister Eileen (1942) Junior Miss (1945)Those Endearing Young Charms (1945; based on his play)Happy Anniversary (1959), based on Anniversary Waltz''

References

External links

1911 births
2004 deaths
20th-century American dramatists and playwrights
American male dramatists and playwrights
Jewish American songwriters
Edgar Award winners
Hollywood blacklist
Writers from New York City
American musical theatre librettists
20th-century American musicians
20th-century American male writers
Tony Award winners
20th-century American Jews
21st-century American Jews